Rafael Druian (January 20, 1923 – September 6, 2002), was an American violinist, conductor and music educator.   He is remembered for his tenures as concertmaster of the Dallas Symphony and Minneapolis Symphony under Antal Dorati, the Cleveland Orchestra under George Szell and the New York Philharmonic under Pierre Boulez.

Life and career

Early career
Druian was born in Vologda, Russia but immigrated with his parents to Havana, Cuba as an infant. He began his formal music training there as a violinist, studying with Amadeo Roldán, the conductor of the Havana Philharmonic. At age 9, he went to Philadelphia to audition for Leopold Stokowski, who recommended him for a scholarship at the Curtis Institute of Music where he studied with Lea Luboshutz and Efrem Zimbalist, graduating in 1942.  He then served in the United States Army from 1943 to 1946, playing the mellophone in the Army Band.

Concertmaster positions

Dallas Symphony Orchestra, under Antal Doráti: 1947 – 1949
Minneapolis Symphony Orchestra, under Antal Doráti: 1949 – 1960
Cleveland Orchestra, under George Szell: 1960 – 1969
New York Philharmonic, under Pierre Boulez: 1971 – 1974

Academic and faculty positions
University of Minnesota
Cleveland Institute of Music, Artist in Residence
California Institute of the Arts, Associate Dean of the Music School, 1969 – 1971
Blossom Music School
Kent State University
State University of New York at Purchase
University of California, San Diego, Professor of Music, 1974 – 1980
The Hartt School
Boston University, 1982? – 1989
Curtis Institute of Music, 1990 – 2001

Notable students

Philip Setzer of the Emerson String Quartet
Herald Klein
Solomiya Ivakhiv

Personal life
Druian was married to Phyllis Rugg Druian.  They had two sons, Peter of Philadelphia, Pennsylvania and Greg of Portland, Oregon.

Discography

Robert Schumann Violin Sonata 1 and Johannes Brahms Violin Sonata 2; Druian (violin); John Simms, (piano); Mercury - MG50091.
Charles Ives Violin Sonatas 1 and 2; Druian (violin); John Simms, (piano); Mercury - MG50096, MG50097, released in 1957.
Fritz Kreisler Favorites; Druian (violin); John Sims, (piano); Mercury - MG50119A, MG50119B.
Wolfgang Amadeus Mozart Sinfonia Concertante, K. 364; Druian (violin); Abraham Skernick (viola); Cleveland Orchestra, George Szell (conductor); Epic/Columbia/CBS/Sony, recorded Nov. 28, 1963; nominated for a Grammy Award in 1965.
Wolfgang Amadeus Mozart Violin Sonatas, K. 301 & 296; Druian (violin), George Szell (piano) (1967)

External links
  A chronological listing of principal musicians of the Cleveland Orchestra with biographical remarks.
  NY Times obituary.
  Druian plays Kreisler Praeludium and Allegro in the style of Pugnani

Sources

Donald Rosenburg, Rafael Druian, orchestra concertmaster in 1960s, obituary in the Cleveland Plain Dealer, September 9, 2002
Overtones, Philadelphia: Curtis Institute of Music, vol. XVII, no. 2, Fall 2002
Unpublished biographical notes, John Gingrich Management, Inc., [1989?]

1923 births
2002 deaths
Concertmasters
American male violinists
American male conductors (music)
Emigrants from the Russian Empire to the United States
20th-century classical violinists
Emigrants from the Russian Empire to Cuba
20th-century American conductors (music)
20th-century American male musicians
Male classical violinists
20th-century American violinists